All Saints Church stands to the north of the village of Handley, Cheshire, England. It is recorded in the National Heritage List for England as a designated Grade II* listed building. The church is an active Anglican parish church in the diocese of Chester, the archdeaconry of Chester and the deanery of Malpas. Its benefice is combined with that of St Alban, Tattenhall.

History

There has been a church on this site from the 12th century. In a restoration in 1854 by James Harrison all the masonry was removed except for the west tower which had been built in 1512. During the restoration a Norman doorway on the north side of the church was lost, but the hammerbeam roof dated 1661 was retained. A chancel and vestry were added in 1891.

Architecture

Exterior
The church is built in ashlar red sandstone with a Welsh slate roof. Its plan consists of west tower, a three-bay nave, a one-bay chancel, a vestry, and a south porch. The tower has three stages and corner buttresses. An inscription on its south wall records its building in 1512. It has a west door above which is a three-light window with empty niches on each side. The belfry windows have three lights, the top of the tower is embattled, it has gargoyles, and the string course includes carved heads.

Interior
The nave has a hammerbeam roof with "excellent scrolled carved corbels". On the north side of the church is a stained glass window by William Wailes. The 17th-century font is octagonal in red sandstone and the parish chest is dated 1677. There is a ring of six bells, the oldest three dating from around 1512, from 1615 and from 1682. A bell from 1709 was cast by Rudhall of Gloucester and the remaining two bells were cast in 1906 by John Taylor and Company. The parish registers begin in 1570 and the churchwardens' accounts in 1710.

See also

Listed buildings in Handley, Cheshire
List of works by James Harrison

References

Church of England church buildings in Cheshire
Grade II* listed churches in Cheshire
English Gothic architecture in Cheshire
Gothic Revival architecture in Cheshire
Diocese of Chester
James Harrison buildings